Padreyoc (Spanish con padre, tiene padre; with father, have father, possibly from Quechua -yuq a suffix to indicate possession) or Quishuar (possibly from Quechua Kiswar for buddleja incana), is a mountain in the Vilcabamba mountain range in the Andes of Peru, about  high. It is located in the Cusco Region, La Convención Province. Padreyoc lies south-west of the mountain Salcantay and east of the mountain Corihuayrachina.

References

Mountains of Peru
Mountains of Cusco Region